Visa requirements for Seychellois citizens are administrative entry restrictions by the authorities of other states placed on citizens of Seychelles. As of 2 July 2019, Seychellois citizens had visa-free or visa on arrival access to 149 countries and territories, ranking the Seychellois passport 27th in terms of travel freedom, and best ranking African country, according to the Henley Passport Index.

As of April 2019, Brunei, Grenada, Mauritius and Seychelles are the only countries whose citizens may travel without a visa to China, Russia, Schengen Area and the United Kingdom.

Visa requirements map

Visa requirements

Dependent, Disputed, or Restricted territories
Unrecognized or partially recognized countries

Dependent and autonomous territories

See also

Visa policy of Seychelles
Seychellois passport
Foreign relations of Seychelles

References and Notes
References

Notes

External links
Travel & Visa: Countries Where Seychelles Nationals Do Not Require a Visa , Ministry of Foreign Affairs of the Republic of Seychelles

Seychellois
Foreign relations of Seychelles